Falconmaster is an adventure module published in 1990 for the Advanced Dungeons & Dragons fantasy role-playing game.

Plot summary
Falconmaster is the sequel to Falcon's Revenge, and is an adventure scenario in which the player characters try to find a cult leader. The module includes fold-up cardstock buildings.

Publication history
WGA2 Falconmaster was written by Richard W. and Anne Brown, with a cover by Ken Frank, and was published by TSR in 1990 as a 64-page booklet with cardstock sheets and an outer folder.

This adventure is part of a series of three scenarios that starts with WGA1 Falcon's Revenge, continues with WGA2 Falconmaster, and concludes with WGA3 Flames of the Falcon.

Reception

Reviews

References

Greyhawk modules
Role-playing game supplements introduced in 1990